William Henry Walter Montagu Douglas Scott, 6th Duke of Buccleuch and 8th Duke of Queensberry,  (9 September 1831 – 5 November 1914) was a Scottish Member of Parliament and peer. He was the paternal grandfather of Princess Alice, Duchess of Gloucester, and the maternal great-grandfather of Prince William of Gloucester and Prince Richard, Duke of Gloucester.

Early life

Born at Montagu House, Whitehall, Westminster, London, into a family of four boys and three girls, William Henry Walter Montagu Douglas Scott was the eldest son of Walter Montagu Douglas Scott, 5th Duke of Buccleuch & 7th Duke of Queensberry and Lady Charlotte Anne Thynne, daughter of Sir Thomas Thynne, 2nd Marquess of Bath, and the Hon. Isabella Elizabeth Byng.

He was educated at Eton College and at Christ Church, Oxford.

Career

He sat as Conservative Member of Parliament for Midlothian from 1853–1868 and from 1874–1880. He was also lieutenant colonel of the Midlothian Yeomanry from 1872, as well as serving as Justice of the Peace (JP) for Selkirkshire, Deputy Lieutenant (DL) of Selkirkshire, and Deputy Lieutenant (DL) of Roxburghshire.

The Political Achievements of the Earl of Dalkeith was a political pamphlet that was published and circulated in Edinburgh during the 1880 United Kingdom general election. It was well presented but inside the neatly printed cover, there were just thirty-two blank pages, making it an early empty book. The publication was thought to be an effective attack on William Montagu Douglas Scott, 6th Duke of Buccleuch, who lost the seat to William Gladstone by 211 votes.

Personal life
On Tuesday 22 November 1859, he married Lady Louisa Jane Hamilton in London, England. Lady Louisa was the third daughter of Sir James Hamilton, 1st Duke of Abercorn and Lady Louisa Jane Russell (daughter of Sir John Russell, 6th Duke of Bedford). As heir apparent to his father's title, William was already "Earl of Dalkeith" by courtesy, and thus his new bride was immediately styled "Countess of Dalkeith". They had six sons and two daughters:

 Walter Henry Montagu Douglas Scott, Earl of Dalkeith (1861–1886)
 John Charles Montagu Douglas Scott, 7th Duke of Buccleuch (1864–1935), who was the father of Princess Alice, Duchess of Gloucester.
 Lord George William Montagu Douglas Scott (1866–1947), who married Lady Elizabeth Emily Manners (daughter of John Manners, 7th Duke of Rutland and Janetta Hughan) on 30 April 1903 and had issue.
 Lord Henry Francis Montagu Douglas Scott (1868–1945).
 Lord Herbert Andrew Montagu Douglas Scott (1872–1944), who married Marie Josephine Edwards on 26 April 1905, and had issue, maternal great-grandfather of Sarah, Duchess of York.
 Lady Katharine Mary Montagu Douglas Scott (1875–1951), who married Thomas Brand, 3rd Viscount Hampden and had issue.
 Lady Constance Anne Montagu Douglas Scott (1877–1970), who married The Hon. Douglas Halyburton Cairns, son of Hugh Cairns, 1st Earl Cairns and Mary Harriet McNeill, on 21 January 1908 and had issue.
 Lord Francis George Montagu Douglas Scott (1879–1952), who married Lady Eileen Nina Evelyn Sibell Elliot-Murray-Kynynmound, daughter of Gilbert Elliot-Murray-Kynynmound, 4th Earl of Minto and Lady Mary Caroline Grey, on 11 February 1915 and had issue.

The Duke died at Montagu House, Whitehall, London, England on Thursday 5 November 1914, in his 83rd year. He had survived his wife, Lady Louisa Jane, by little more than two years. He was survived by seven of his eight children and their families.

He was buried on Tuesday 10 November 1914 in the family crypt of the Buccleuch Memorial Chapel in St. Mary's Episcopal Church, Dalkeith, Midlothian. The church is located on Dalkeith's High Street, at the entrance to Dalkeith Country Park.

Titles, honours and awards
9 September 1831 – 15 April 1884:  William Henry Walter Montagu Douglas Scott, Earl of Dalkeith
5 August 1875:  Invested as Knight of the Thistle (KT)
16 April 1884:  6th Duke of Buccleuch & 8th Duke of Queensberry
7 December 1897:  Invested as Knight of The Most Noble Order of the Garter
7 December 1897:  Resigned as Knight of the Thistle
1900:  Captain General of The Royal Company of Archers
10 December 1901:  Invested as Privy Counsellor

References

External links 
 
 

1831 births
1914 deaths
People from Westminster
Anglo-Scots
108
206
Knights of the Garter
Knights of the Thistle
People educated at Eton College
Alumni of Christ Church, Oxford
Dalkeith, William Montagu-Douglas-Scott, Earl of
Conservative Party (UK) hereditary peers
Members of the Privy Council of the United Kingdom
Dalkeith, William Montagu-Douglas-Scott, Earl of
Dalkeith, William Montagu-Douglas-Scott, Earl of
Dalkeith, William Montagu-Douglas-Scott, Earl of
Dalkeith, William Montagu-Douglas-Scott, Earl of
Dalkeith, William Montagu-Douglas-Scott, Earl of
Buccleuch, D6
Lord-Lieutenants of Dumfries
W
Presidents of the Marylebone Cricket Club
Members of the Royal Company of Archers
Scottish justices of the peace
Scottish landowners
Scottish Tory MPs (pre-1912)
Dog breeders
19th-century Scottish businesspeople